Howard Earle Skipper (born in Avon Park, Florida on November 21, 1915; died in Mountain Brook, Alabama on January 2, 2006) was a noted American oncologist. He grew up in Sebring, Florida and received his science degrees (BS, MS, PhD) from the University of Florida.

During the war, he became interested in cancer research while working for what was then called the Chemical Warfare Service of the United States Army. By 1957, he had become a notable cancer researcher in Alabama and went on to serve as head of the Southern Research Institute.

Awards 
1974 Albert Lasker Award for Basic Medical Research (shared)
 1980 Bristol-Myers Squibb Award
1982 Kettering Prize

References 

American oncologists
University of Alabama faculty
People from Sebring, Florida
Physicians from Birmingham, Alabama
People from Mountain Brook, Alabama
1915 births
2006 deaths
People from Avon Park, Florida